is the name of a Buddhist temple and folk religion pilgrimage destination in the center of remote Shimokita Peninsula of Aomori Prefecture, in the northern Tōhoku region of northern Japan. The temple is located in the caldera of an active volcano and is believed in Japanese mythology to be one of the gates to the underworld.

Etymology
The mountain was once called Usoriyama by the Ainu people, but was gradually changed by the Japanese to Osore, meaning "dread", which may be a statement to the sites of enshrined dead in the area.

Mount Osore volcano
Although Mount Osore last erupted over 10,000 years ago, the area has many fumaroles emitting steam and volcanic gases (especially sulfur dioxide), indicating that it is still an active volcano. Lake Usori is a caldera lake at the center of Mount Osore, with highly acidic waters.

During the Meiji period, sulphur deposits in the area were exploited, partly to meet the demand for gunpowder production by the growing Japanese military; however the deposits were not economical to mine due to the remoteness of the site and the increasing availability of sulphur as a byproduct of petroleum refining.

Bodai-ji temple and pilgrimage location
The mountain is the location of a Sōtō Zen Buddhist temple,  which claims to have been founded in 862 AD by the famed monk Ennin, with  Jizō Bosatsu as its main image. The temple was abandoned in 1457 and restored back to use in 1530. In popular folk religion, the otherworldly setting of Mount Osore, with its charred landscape of blasted rocks filled with bubbling pits noted for unearthly hues and noxious fumes came to be one of several places in Japan identified to be an entrance to the Underworld. A small brook running to the neighboring Lake Usori was equated to the Sanzu River, a river that deceased souls need to cross on their way to the afterlife.

A unique feature of Bodai-ji is the presence of mediums known as itako who claim to summon the souls of the dead and deliver messages in their voices. These mediums were traditionally blind and had to receive extensive spiritual training and purification rituals; however, in modern times, their number has dwindled and not all are blind. The temple has a twice-yearly Itako Taisai festival held in summer and autumn.

The temple also maintains a hot spring resort for use by pilgrims and tourists.

In modern culture
The work of contemporary artist Nara Yoshitomo, who is a native of Aomori Prefecture, is believed to be influenced, at least subconsciously, by Mount Osore (Ivy, 2010).  For instance, his piece entitled “Not Everything But/ Green House” depicts a small female child standing over a pile of discarded dolls of varying characteristics and eras much like those observed at Mount Osore.

As part of a collection of fictional fungi, artist Takeshi Yamada created the Oh-dokuro-dake (or “skull mushroom”) and the story surrounding their presence on Mount Osore for his "center for medical mycology" art project.

Gallery

Notes

References
 Fackler, M. (2009, August 20). As Japan's mediums die, ancient tradition fades. The New York Times, p. 8, Retrieved from https://www.nytimes.com
 Global Volcanism Program. (n.d.). Osore-yama. Retrieved from http://www.volcano.si.edu/world/volcano.cfm?vnum=0803-29=
 Ivy, M. (2010). The art of cute little things: Nara Yoshitomo's parapolitics. Mechademia, 5(1), 3-29. doi:10.1353/mec.2010.0020
 Wonderland Japan WAttention. (n.d.). Mt. Osore.  Retrieved from  https://www.webcitation.org/6Bp5xzjwO?url=http://www.wattention.com/archives/mt-osore
 Yamada, T. (2011, June). Skull mushroom. Retrieved from https://www.flickr.com/photos/museumofworldwonders2/5725108088

External links

Official home page of Bodai-ji
Japan National Tourist Organization
Japan guide.com

Osore
Mediumship
Soto temples
Osore
Osore
Mutsu, Aomori
Tourist attractions in Aomori Prefecture
Buddhist temples in Aomori Prefecture